Salih Nijazi (15 March 1876 – 28 November 1941) was the 1st Dedebaba (or Kryegjysh) of the Bektashi Order that was established in Albania in 1930.

Biography

Early life
Salih Nijazi was born on 5 March 1876 in Starja, a village in the Kolonja region of southeastern Albania. He and his family emigrated to Istanbul when he was young. He received a Bektashi education at the pir evi of Haji Bektash Veli in Hacıbektaş (Hacıbektaşköy), central Turkey.

Religious leadership
In 1897, Salih Nijazi served as a muhib under Fejzi Dede of Maricaj. In 1908, he rose to the rank of baba, and was then sent to serve in Albania. When he returned to the pir evi of Haji Bektash Veli, he was appointed as a gjysh (dede).

In 1916, Salih Nijazi was appointed Dedebaba (kryegjysh) of the Bektashi Order, succeeding Fejzi Dede. However, Mustafa Kemal Atatürk banned all dervish orders and their tekkes in 1925 as part of the secularization of Turkey. He unsuccessfully appealed to Atatürk, saying that the Bektashis had helped him gain power in Turkey. As a result, the Bektashis were forced to move outside Turkey and soon operated primarily from Albania.

In 1930, Salih Nijazi established the World Headquarters of the Bektashi movement in Tirana. The construction of the headquarters was finished in 1941 during the Italian occupation of Albania.

In Albania, he introduced major Bektashi ceremonies that were traditionally held at well-known tekkes in places such as Hacıbektaş in central Turkey, Dimetoka (Didymoteicho) in Thrace (Greece), Karbala in Iraq, and also Merdivenköy near Istanbul.

Death

On 28 November 1941, Salih Nijazi Dede was murdered by unknown people. His murder remains unsolved, with Albanians claiming that he was murdered by Italian fascists as part of a terror campaign against the Albanian National Liberation Movement, while Italians claimed that he was murdered by brigands (see also World War II in Albania).

References

1876 births
1941 deaths
Bektashi dedebabas
Albanian Sufis
Albanian religious leaders
People from Kolonjë